Summerspell is an independent film written and directed by Lina Shanklin. It premiered at the U.S. Film Festival (the precursor to Sundance) on April 1, 1983.

Plot 
The film follows as the members of a large extended family gather on the Fourth of July for a not-so-happy reunion on their California ranch right after World War II.

Cast 

 Louise Davis as Felda
 Edna Wisdom as Selma
 Vernon Lafon as Ruth
 Ed Wright as Grandfather Windom
 Frank Whiteman as Lowell Windom

Production 
Shanklin based the script off her experiences growing up in the American Southwest. She said it took her nearly four years to get the film made.

References 

American independent films
1983 independent films
1983 films
1980s American films